Centre Party is a political party in Latvia. It was founded on 11 November 2005 under the name "All-Latvian Party 21st Century", renamed the Latvian movement "SOLIDARITY" in 2009, in 2016 became the Latvian Centrist Party, but since November 7, 2018 has been operating under the current name. The party advertises itself as a "patriotic, Christian-conservative party representing the majority of Latvian society."

History 
On July 25, 2016, it was transformed into the Latvian Centrist Party. At that time, Aleksandra Siliniece, Aivars Silinieks and Andžejs Zdanovičs were on the party board.

On August 7, 2018, the party submitted its list of candidates for the Saeima elections. The party's program included the restoration of the lats as the national currency and its withdrawal from NATO. In the elections, the Latvian Centrist Party received the lowest voter support - 0.11%, which was significantly less than the number of invalid ballot papers handed over.

In the 2019 European Parliament elections, starting as a Centre Party, the leader of the party list was Normunds Grostiņš. In the election campaign, party advocated a traditional family, a society based on traditional values and compensation from the European Union for 15 years of discrimination against Latvia as a member.

The Centre Party participated unsuccessfully in the Riga City Council's elections in 2020 and promised to reduce heating costs, support the residents of denationalized houses and gradually switch to free public transport in Riga. The first number of the party list was Jānis Valtervitenheims, the second was Normunds Grostiņš. The ticket placed last, with a mere 0.16% of the vote.

The party did not participate in the 2022 Latvian parliamentary election, however, multiple members (e.g. party leader Normunds Grostiņš and Andrejs Pagors) ran on the Latvian Russian Union ticket.

References 

Political parties in Latvia
2005 establishments in Latvia
Political parties established in 2005